Esplen may refer to:

Esplen (Pittsburgh), Pennsylvania
Esplen baronets, a title in the Baronetage of the United Kingdom
John Esplen (1863–1930), English shipbuilder